Wendy Jans (born 14 June 1983, in Bree, Belgium) is a Belgian professional snooker and pool player. She has won the IBSF World Snooker Championship for women seven times. She reached her first women's world final at the 2022 World Women's Snooker Championship, but lost 5–6 to Nutcharut Wongharuthai on the final black ball.

Career
Jans has won multiple national, European and World snooker titles. She won the Belgian national title seventeen times between 1998 and 2019.

She has won a record twelve European Billiards and Snooker Association Ladies Championship titles, including six consecutive titles from 2013 to 2018, and the IBSF World Ladies Snooker Championship in 2006, 2012, 2013, 2014, 2015, 2016, 2017. Having beaten Waratthanun Sukritthanes in the 2017 IBSF World Snooker Championship final to win her seventh title, Jans lost 2–5 to her in the 2018 final.

Jans, Reanne Evans and Anita Rizzuti all took part in the 2010 World Open, playing against men. Jans lost 1–3 to Simon Bedford in the first round. Jans and Ng On-yee were the two women competitors in the mixed singles snooker at the 2017 World Games, held in Wrocław. Jans lost 1–3 to Declan Brennans in her first match.

At the 2022 World Women's Snooker Championship, Jans defeated 12-time champion Reanne Evans 4–1 in the quarter-finals. She advanced to reach her first women's world final, but lost 5–6 to Nutcharut Wongharuthai on the final black ball.

She owns a snooker club in Neerpelt. Her highest  is 136.

Career Highlights

Snooker

IBSF women's finals

European Championship Women's Individual Finals

Team competitions

BBSA Belgian National Championship (Women's)

Other Snooker

Pool
 Ladies Spirit Tour 2005 #3 (Coral Springs)
 Weert 9-Ball Open – 2006, 2008

References

External links
 Profile on Global Snooker
Profile on WPBSA

Living people
Belgian snooker players
Female pool players
1983 births
People from Bree, Belgium
Female snooker players
Competitors at the 2017 World Games
Sportspeople from Limburg (Belgium)
21st-century Belgian women